Earl B. Hunt (January 8, 1933 – April 12 or 13, 2016) was an American psychologist specializing in the study of human and artificial intelligence. Within these fields he focused on individual differences in intelligence and the implications of these differences within a high-technology society. He was in partial retirement as emeritus professor of psychology and adjunct professor of computer science at the University of Washington at the time of his death. His book Will We Be Smart Enough? discussed demographic projections and psychometric research as they relate to predictions of possible future workplaces.

He was president of the International Society for Intelligence Research in 2011.

Publications

Books

Magazine articles

References

External links
 Exploring Intelligence: Cognition in people, machines, and the future

1933 births
2016 deaths
American computer scientists
20th-century American psychologists
Artificial intelligence researchers
American cognitive scientists
Fellows of the American Psychological Association
Fellows of the American Association for the Advancement of Science
Fellows of the Association for Psychological Science
Intelligence researchers
University of Washington faculty